Abacetus aenescens is a species of ground beetle in the subfamily Pterostichinae. It was described by Peringuey in 1896 and is endemic to South Africa.

References

aenescens
Beetles described in 1896
Insects of Southern Africa